Translate is an album by Sexy Sadie, released in 2006.

Track listing
"Second to Last"
"My Home Is Not a Place"
"Nonsense"
"By the Fireside"
"No One's Better"
"Slow Down"
"Not Like You"
"Around Our Heads"
"Great Minds Start Little
"Underneath my bed"
"Translate"
"Thank you too"

2006 albums